The Radomka is a river in central Poland and a left tributary of the Vistula. It has a length of 98 km and a basin area of over 2000 km2 (all in Poland). The river has its source in forests 4 km south from Przysucha, at the height of 310 meters above sea level. There is a retention reservoir, built in the valley of the Radomka in Domaniów, which has the largest surface area of any lakes in Mazowsze Voivodeship (5 – 7 km2). It is also utilised for recreation purposes.

After flowing through the hills of the Lesser Poland Upland, the Radomka enters a wide urstromtal, to finally enter the Vistula near Ryczywol, at the height of 160 meters above sea level.

Puszcza Nature Reserve 
The reserve, located in a forest at the source of the Radomka, was opened in 1978. Its purpose is to preserve natural wilderness, with its fir and beech trees.

Towns along the Radomka 
Przysucha
Wieniawa
Mniszek
Przytyk

Main tributaries 
Mleczna 
Narutówka
Jastrzębianka 
Szabasówka

Sources 
 

Rivers of Poland
Rivers of Masovian Voivodeship